was a town located in Iwase District, Fukushima Prefecture, Japan.

As of 2003, the town had an estimated population of 6,455 and a density of 106.98 persons per km². The total area was 60.34 km².

History 
The people lived in Naganuma, because of Jomon pottery(縄文土器)and Dugout(竪穴式住居)discovered from Tsukakoshi remains in 25th century BC.

Naganuma town built by Takatoki Naganuma in 1260 AD.

It is deserted castle by Decree of One Castle Per Province(一国一城令) in 1615 AD.

Old Naganuma was formed as a result of the enforcement of town organization in 1901 AD.

Old Naganuma town and Hokotsuki village merged Naganuma town in 1955 AD.

On April 1, 2005 AD, Naganuma, along with the village of Iwase (also from Iwase District), was merged into the expanded city of Sukagawa.

Education 
 Naganuma Kindergarten
 Naganuma Primary School
 Naganuma East Primary School
 Naganuma Junior High School
 Naganuma High School

Industry

Tradition 
From Edo era to Meiji era made Naganuma dyed paper(長沼染型紙).And from Meiji era to Taisho era made Naganuma ware(長沼焼).

Local attractions

Tourist spot 

Naganuma Castle
Fujinuma Lake National park
Naganuma Folk Museum
Naganuma Minami Kodate

Festival 

Naganuma Nebuta Festival

Transportation 
From Sukagawa station to Naganuma town (Yatano or Yokota) by bus in Sukagawa station stop 1 pole.

It take about one hour.

See also 
Ten-ei
 Naganuma, Hokkaido
 Sukagawa, Fukushima

References

External links 

Sukagawa official website 
Fujinuma Lake National Park
Ask Shopping Mall
Naganuma Nebuta Festival(Japanese travel guide )

Dissolved municipalities of Fukushima Prefecture